George Winslow (born July 28, 1963) is a former punter in the National Football League. 1987 Winslow was signed as a free agent.  He first played with the Cleveland Browns during the 1987 NFL season. Released during the 1987 season.  Buffalo signed Winslow in 1988, but released him August 1988 during pre-season.  After a year away from the NFL, he played with the New Orleans Saints during the 1989 NFL season.  The Saints released Winslow October 1989.  November 1989 he had a tryout with the Eagles, but was not signed.

Winslow was voted All-Decade Team and All-Catholic Team for his time at La Salle High School.  While in college, one coach stated "The kid had one kick that hung up there for 6.2 seconds."

George's son Ryan Winslow has played in the National Football League (NFL) as a punter as well.

References

Players of American football from Philadelphia
Cleveland Browns players
New Orleans Saints players
American football punters
Wisconsin Badgers football players
Villanova Wildcats football players
1963 births
Living people